The 10 states and 3 administrative areas of South Sudan are divided into 79 counties.

History 
Before the independence of South Sudan from Sudan, the Counties were known as Districts. Upon Independence in 2011, the 10 states of South Sudan were divided into 79 counties. More counties were established during the South Sudanese Civil War, when the country increased to 32 states, and the number of counties exceeded 100. However, with the return to 10 states and 3 administrative areas in 2020, South Sudan reverted to 79 counties.

Northern Bahr el Ghazal

Aweil Center County
 Aweil East County
 Aweil North County
Aweil South County
 Aweil West County

Western Bahr el Ghazal

Jur River County
 Raja County
 Wau County

Lakes State

 Awerial County
 Cueibet County
 Rumbek Center County
 Rumbek East County
 Rumbek North County
 Wulu County
 Yirol East County
 Yirol West County

Warrap

 Gogrial East County
 Gogrial West County
 Tonj East County
 Tonj North County
 Tonj South County
 Twic County

Western Equatoria

 Ezo County
 Ibba County
 Maridi County
 Mundri East County
 Mundri West County
 Mvolo County
 Nagero County
 Nzara County
 Tambura County
 Yambio County

Central Equatoria

 Juba County
 Kajo Keji County
 Lainya County
 Morobo County
 Terekeka County
 Yei County

Eastern Equatoria

 Budi County
 Ikwoto County
 Kapoeta East County
 Kapoeta North County
 Kapoeta South County
 Lafon County
 Magwi County
 Torit County

Jonglei

 Akobo County
 Ayod County
 Bor County
 Duk County
 Fangak County
 Nyirol County
 Pigi County
 Twic East County
 Uror County

Unity State

 Guit County
 Koch County
 Leer County
 Mayiandit County
 Mayom County
 Panyijar County
 Rubkona County

Upper Nile State

 Baliet County
 Fashoda County
 Longechuk County
 Maban County
 Maiwut County
 Malakal County
 Manyo County
 Melut County
 Nasir County
 Panykang County
 Renk County
 Ulang County

Ruweng Administrative Area

 Abiemnom County
 Panriang County

Pibor Administrative Area

 Pibor County
 Pochalla County

See also 
 Districts of Sudan
 States of South Sudan

References

 Map of Southern Sudan showing original county borders
 Southern Sudan Legislative Assembly
 
 Southern Sudan: Overview of States and Counties

 
South Sudan, Counties
South Sudan 3
Counties, South Sudan
Counties